Small Wonder or variants may refer to:

Film, television and theatre
 Small Wonder (TV series), a 1985–1989 American sitcom
 A Small Wonder, a 1966 Australian television film
 Small Wonders, a 1995 documentary film
 Small Wonder, a 1948 Broadway revue written and directed by Burt Shevelove
 The First Time (1952 film) (working title Small Wonder), an American film directed by Frank Tashlin

Music
 Small Wonder Records, a defunct British record label
 Small Wonder, a 1970s Canadian band featuring Henry Small
 "Small Wonder", a song by John Abercrombie and John Scofield from Solar, 1984

Other uses
 Small Wonder (essay collection), a 2002 book by Barbara Kingsolver
 Small Wonder, a webcomic published by Viper Comics
 The Small Wonder, a nickname for the U.S. state of Delaware